Liliana Maria Dragomir (born 18 June 1990) is a Romanian long distance runner. She competed in the women's marathon at the 2017 World Championships in Athletics. In 2020, she competed in the women's race at the 2020 World Athletics Half Marathon Championships held in Gdynia, Poland.

References

External links

1990 births
Living people
Romanian female long-distance runners
Romanian female marathon runners
World Athletics Championships athletes for Romania
Place of birth missing (living people)